The Table Tennis Victoria Super League commenced on Good Friday, 6 April 2007, with its first ever Team Draft. The 2007 Table Tennis Victoria Super League brought 18 of Australia's top table tennis players together in a 10-week series involving 6 clubs.  The stakes are high, only months away from qualification for the Beijing Olympics all players will want to make their mark.  Each team will involve 2 male players and a female. All players are State or National representatives.  On the day there were 26 athletes, 17 male and 9 female, vying for 12 male places and 6 female places on six teams. The clubs that will be contesting the inaugural season are –

 Sunshine and Districts Table Tennis Association
 Mornington Table Tennis Association
 Geelong Table Tennis Association
 Ballarat Table Tennis Association
 Croydon and Districts Table Tennis Association
 Melbourne Sports and Aquatic Centre Table Tennis Team (MSAC)

Each of the competing teams has a "salary cap" of 500 points.

The weekly competition will be competed in the international standard venue of the Melbourne Sports and Aquatic Centre (MSAC), matches will be contested weekly on a Wednesday night with a start time of 7.30 pm, matches are likely to conclude within three hours. With the available facilities of this world class venue, the Super League will be looking to expand the knowledge of table tennis to not just the spectators, but into households with a TV series being filmed during the first seven rounds. Table Tennis Victoria (TTV) wishes that the exposure brought by the Super League will assist in the continued growth of the sport since the Melbourne Commonwealth Games 2006.

Format 

The format of the competition is as follows –

The match will conclude once one team has reached an unbeatable four wins. The results will vary between 4–0 to 4–3.

Athletes 

The 27 athletes vying for these positions were:

Males

Females

Draft 

The draft was conducted by local celebrities of Big Brother fame – Dino Delic and John Bric.

As this was the inaugural draft, selection was made completely random when TTV CEO Dale Gilson, drew balls out of the Cup teams will be vying for. First pick went to MSAC, 2nd to Croydon, 3rd to Geelong, 4th to Ballarat, 5th to Mornington and the last pick was given to Sunshine. From this order came the first two rounds of the draft, with the second round the opposite order of the first. The first three players to be chosen have represented Australia at the Olympics, they went in order, Brett Clarke, David Zalcberg and Simon Gerada. Following was the three members of the Australian Junior Team that finished tenth in the 2006 World Junior Championships coming in as, Kyle Davis, Trent Carter and Robert Frank.

2007 season teams

Ladder

TTV Super League Disbanded  

A 2009 season of the TTV super league failed to eventuate despite the best efforts of TTV super league creator Simon Gerada and many other officials and players. Difficulties included administration problems between clubs and the costs of entry for a team into the league.

Table tennis competitions
Sport in Victoria (Australia)